Krasicki (plural: Krasiccy, feminine form: Krasicka) was a Polish noble family  first mentioned in the 15th century. Many Krasiccy were magnates in the First Republic of Poland.

History
The family originated from Masovia. Their family nest was Siecień, and they initially went by the name Siecieński (z Siecina). On 1 July 1631, one branch of the family was elevated to the title of the Imperial Count by Ferdinand II. On March 14, 1786 members of the untitled branch, namely Antoni, Gabriel and Stanisław Krasicki of the Rogala coat of arms, were granted the title of Count in Galicia with the predicate Hoch- und wohlgeboren ( High-born and noble ), based on their blood relation to Ignacy Krasicki.

Notable members
 August Krasicki
 Jan Boży Krasicki
 Karol Aleksander Krasicki
 Ksawery Franciszek Krasicki
 Ignacy Krasicki

Residences

Gallery

See also
 Fables and Parables

References

Bibliography
 T. 5: Oświecenie. W: Bibliografia Literatury Polskiej – Nowy Korbut. Warszawa: Państwowy Instytut Wydawniczy, 1967, s. 185–216.
 Polski Słownik Biograficzny t. 15 s. 144
 Andrzej Romaniak, Ostatni obrońca sanockiego zamku, Tygodnik Sanocki, nr 33 (719) z 19 sierpnia 2005, s 11.